

152001–152100 

|-id=067
| 152067 Deboy ||  || Christopher C. Deboy (born 1969) is a radio-frequency engineer at the Johns Hopkins University Applied Physics Laboratory, who served as the Radio Communications System Lead for the New Horizons mission to Pluto. || 
|}

152101–152200 

|-id=146
| 152146 Rosenlappin ||  || Gary Rosenbaum (born 1952) and Terri Lappin (born 1961) have organized observing and outreach activities within the Tucson Amateur Astronomy Association for several decades || 
|-id=188
| 152188 Morricone ||  || Ennio Morricone (1928–2020), prolific Italian film composer || 
|}

152201–152300 

|-id=217
| 152217 Akosipov ||  || Alexandr Kuzmich Osipov (1920–2004), research worker at the Astronomical Observatory of Kiev University || 
|-id=226
| 152226 Saracole ||  || Sara Loraine Cole (born 1969), American biologist and animal behaviorist || 
|-id=227
| 152227 Argoli ||  || Andrea Argoli (1570–1657), Paduan astronomer, mathematician and physician || 
|-id=233
| 152233 Van Till ||  || Howard J. Van Till (born 1938), physics professor at Calvin College from 1965 until 1997 || 
|-id=290
| 152290 Lorettaoberheim ||  || Loretta Oberheim (born 1954) and her efforts in healthcare services and charity involvement in the State of Delaware. || 
|-id=299
| 152299 Vanautgaerden ||  || Jan Vanautgaerden (born 1978), a passionate Belgian amateur astronomer. || 
|}

152301–152400 

|-id=319
| 152319 Pynchon ||  || Thomas R. Pynchon Jr. (born 1937), an American novelist. || 
|-id=320
| 152320 Lichtenknecker ||  || Dieter Lichtenknecker (1933–1990) was a German telescope maker. He founded his company in 1959 in Weil der Stadt and later moved to Hasselt, Belgium. He was well known for his Database on Variable Stars. || 
|}

152401–152500 

|-id=454
| 152454 Darnyi ||  || Tamás Darnyi (born 1967), Hungarian swimmer || 
|-id=481
| 152481 Stabia ||  || Castellammare di Stabia, a city in southern Italy. || 
|}

152501–152600 

|-id=533
| 152533 Aggas ||  || Steven Aggas, American engineer and founder of the Apache-Sitgreaves Center for Astrophysics  in Arizona || 
|-id=559
| 152559 Bodelschwingh ||  || Friedrich von Bodelschwingh the Elder (1831–1910), German founder of the Bodelschwinghsche Anstalten Bethel charitable foundations || 
|}

152601–152700 

|-id=641
| 152641 Fredreed ||  || Frederick Reed (1906–1978), grandfather of David R. De Graff who co-discovered this minor planet || 
|-id=647
| 152647 Rinako ||  || Rinako Asami (born 1993), daughter of Atsuo Asami who discovered this minor planet || 
|-id=657
| 152657 Yukifumi ||  || Yukifumi Murakami (born 1979), Japanese javelin thrower || 
|}

152701–152800 

|-id=750
| 152750 Brloh ||  || The Czech village of Brloh, originally belonging to the Rosenbergs, is situated right in the heart of the Blanský les (see ) Protected Landscape Area || 
|}

152801–152900 

|-bgcolor=#f2f2f2
| colspan=4 align=center | 
|}

152901–153000 

|-id=985
| 152985 Kenkellermann ||  || Kenneth Irwin Kellermann (born 1937), a radio astronomer at the (U.S.) National Radio Astronomy Observatory. || 
|}

References 

152001-153000